Miss Venezuela 1962 was the ninth edition of Miss Venezuela pageant held at Teatro Paris (now called Teatro La Campiña) in Caracas, Venezuela, on June 27, 1962. The winner of the pageant was Olga Antonetti, Miss Anzoátegui.

This was the first year that Miss Venezuela pageant was broadcast on national television by RCTV.

Results
Miss Venezuela 1962 - Olga Antonetti (Miss Anzoátegui)
1st runner-up - Betsabé Franco (Miss Aragua) to Miss World 1962
2nd runner-up - Virginia Bailey (Miss Nueva Esparta) to Miss Universe 1962
3rd runner-up - Luisa Rondón-Márquez (Miss Distrito Federal) to Miss United Nations 1963
4th runner-up - Isabel Osorio (Miss Táchira)

Delegates

 Miss Anzoátegui - Olga Antonetti Núñez
 Miss Aragua - Betsabé Franco Blanco
 Miss Carabobo - Egleé Ramos Giugni
 Miss Departamento Vargas - Sulbey Naranjo
 Miss Distrito Federal - Ana Luisa Rondón-Márquez Tarchetti
 Miss Lara - Nora Riera Jiménez
 Miss Mérida - Elizabeth Peñaloza
 Miss Miranda - Annie Alexandrow López
 Miss Monagas - Ida Josefina Chacón Rojas
 Miss Nueva Esparta - Virginia Bailey Lázzari
 Miss Táchira - Isabel Osorio Urdaneta
 Miss Trujillo - Ana Dolores González Miliani

External links
Miss Venezuela official website

1962 beauty pageants
1962 in Venezuela